The Montgomery 12 is an American sailing dinghy that was designed by Lyle Hess as a daysailer and first built in 1972.

Production
The design was the first boat built by Montgomery Marine Products in Dana Point, California, United States, but it is now out of production.

Design
The Montgomery 12 is a recreational sailboat, built predominantly of fiberglass, with wooden trim. It has a fractional sloop rig with aluminum spars, a spooned plumb stem, a vertical transom, a transom-hung rudder controlled by a tiller and a retractable centerboard. It displaces .

See also
List of sailing boat types

References

External links
Photo of a Montgomery 12 moored
Photo of a Montgomery 12 rigged on its trailer
Photo of a Montgomery 12 cockpit

Dinghies
1970s sailboat type designs
Sailboat type designs by Lyle Hess
Sailboat types built in the United States
Sailboat types built by Montgomery Marine Products